On 13 September 2022, five people, including the former head of the Peace Committee and two policemen, were killed in a bomb blast in Swat district of Khyber Pakhtunkhwa. In a statement, the Tehreek-e-Taliban Pakistan has accepted the responsibility for the blast, but the authorities have not yet confirmed this claim.

The Chief Minister of Khyber Pakhtunkhwa in a statement condemned the blast and said that the sacrifices of those who lost their lives will not go in vain.

Background

References

2022 in Pakistan
Swat District
2022 murders in Pakistan
2020s crimes in Khyber Pakhtunkhwa
September 2022 crimes in Asia
September 2022 events in Pakistan
Terrorist incidents in Pakistan in 2022